Ants Piip's cabinet was in office in Estonia from 26 October 1920 to 25 January 1921, when it was succeeded by Konstantin Päts' first cabinet.

Members

This cabinet's members were the following:

References

Cabinets of Estonia